Honeycreeper is a term for several sorts of songbirds:
 The "true honeycreepers" are three genera in the tanager family.
 Cyanerpes, four species of typical honeycreepers
 Chlorophanes, the green honeycreeper
 Iridophanes, the golden-collared honeycreeper
 Hawaiian honeycreepers, a group of birds in the finch family
Honeycreeper may also refer to:
 Honeycreeper (album), an album by Japanese pop band Puffy AmiYumi

Animal common name disambiguation pages